City Charter Schools is a charter school operator in the Los Angeles metropolitan area.  it operates two schools: City Language Immersion Charter (early childhood to grade 5) and The City School (grades 6–8).

It previously operated City High School. The school opened in 2015 on the campus of Los Angeles High School. Employees of the Los Angeles Unified School District (LAUSD) initially suggested using Emerson Middle School as the location, but Emerson Middle parents, in the process of asking for more area parents to enroll in the LAUSD-operated Emerson, opposed the plan and started a petition against it. The opening of a new girls' school in Los Angeles High forced City High to find new quarters. The school moved to space in a synagogue; it had rejected the option to move into Dorsey High School partly because members of the City Charter Schools community disapproved of the location. The synagogue's rent was high and not enough students were enrolled to pay for the space; 125 were enrolled even though 150 were initially scheduled to enroll. City High closed in September 2016.

Demographics
City High School had 116 students circa 2016, with 28% being non-Hispanic white. The City School's student body in that period was 57% non-Hispanic white. The middle school's demographics drew heavily from the Los Angeles Westside, and the founders of the charter network were based in the Westside.

References

External links
 City Charter Schools

Charter schools in California